Howard Harold Seliger (4 December 1924, New York City – 20 December 2012) was a physicist, biochemist, and biology professor, known for his research on bioluminescence.

Biography
Seliger graduated from Townsend Harris High School in 1939 and from the City College of New York in  1943). After serving in the U.S. Air Force from 1943 to 1946, he studied physics at Purdue University and graduated there with M.S. in 1948. From 1948 to 1958 he was a senior physicist in the Radioactivity Division of the National Bureau of Standards (NBS) and was enrolled part-time at the University of Maryland. He graduated there with Ph.D. in 1954. At the NBS he developed a highly sensitive method of measurement of photons produced by radioactive emissions. He was elected a Fellow of the American Physical Society in 1958. With the aid of a recommendation by W. F. Libby, Seliger became a Guggenheim Fellow for the academic year 1958–1959, which he spent in the biology department of Johns Hopkins University. There he worked with William D. McElroy, who had recently isolated the enzyme luciferase. Seliger used his measurement techniques for photon scintillation to make the first measurement of the quantum yield of the firefly light reaction. This was the beginning of his outstanding achievements in the study of bioluminescence in fireflies, bacteria, phytoplankton, fish, and ctenophores.

Seliger, as part of a team of Johns Hopkins scientists, studied more than 100 different species of fireflies in Maryland and on the island of Jamaica. He built an instrument, called by him a "firefly gun," which his team used in making the first measurements of the specific flash patterns of various firefly species in their natural habitat. Their research "showed that the species-specific colors of the bioluminescence of fireflies represented natural selection for the optimization of the ratio of light signals to interfering ambient light intensities (noise) at the times of their emergence."

Seliger was the president of the American Society for Photobiology in 1980–1981. Until he was 75 years old, he taught and did research at Johns Hopkins University. He was elected a Fellow of the American Association for the Advancement of Science in 1997.

He was married for 69 years to the former Beatrice Semel (born in 1926). Upon his death at the age of 88, he was survived by his widow, two daughters, two grandsons, and a great-grandson.

Selected publications

Articles

Books

References

1924 births
2012 deaths
20th-century American physicists
21st-century American physicists
20th-century American biologists
21st-century American biologists
Townsend Harris High School alumni
City College of New York alumni
Purdue University alumni
University System of Maryland alumni
Johns Hopkins University faculty
Fellows of the American Association for the Advancement of Science
Fellows of the American Physical Society